Line 800 is one of CFR's main lines in Romania, having a total length of . The main line, connecting Bucharest with the Black Sea coast at Mangalia, passes through Fetești, Medgidia, and Constanța.

Secondary lines

Gallery

References

Railway lines in Romania
Standard gauge railways in Romania